United Arab Emirates competed at the 2020 Summer Paralympics in Tokyo, Japan, from 24 August to 5 September 2021.

Medalists

Competitors
Source:

Athletics 

Mohamed Hammadi competed in the men's 100m T34 and men's 800m T34 events. He qualified for these events after winning the bronze medal in the men's 100m T34 and the gold medal in the men's 800m T34 events at the 2019 World Para Athletics Championships held in Dubai, United Arab Emirates.

Noura Alktebi competed in the women's club throw F32 and women's shot put F32 events. She qualified for both events after finishing in 4th place in both the women's shot put F32 and women's club throw F32 events at the 2019 World Para Athletics Championships.
Men's track

Women's field

Shooting 

Abdullah Sultan Alaryani, Saif Alnuaimi and Abdulla Saif Alaryani are scheduled to compete.

See also 
 United Arab Emirates at the Paralympics

References 

Nations at the 2020 Summer Paralympics
2020
Summer Paralympics